= Scandinavian Brewers' Review =

Scandinavian Brewers' Review is a bimonthly English-language trade magazine focusing on beer and soft drink production. It routinely features articles (mostly from trade members) on production, innovation, sustainability, finances, marketing and logistics.

Scandinavian Brewers' Review is published by the Danish Brewers' Guild every even month. Its headquarters is in Aarhus.
